Gletsch railway station is a  railway station serving the village of Gletsch, in the Canton of Valais, Switzerland.

History and operations

The station was opened in 1914, and owned and operated from then until 1981 by the Furka Oberalp Bahn (FO), which connects Brig in Valais, via Andermatt in Uri, with Göschenen, Uri, and Disentis/Mustér, Graubünden.

In 1982, the original portion of the FO between Oberwald in Valais and Realp in Uri, including the Gletsch railway station, was replaced by an FO line passing through the then new Furka Base Tunnel.  The superseded portion of the FO line was abandoned.

Since , the abandoned portion of FO line has been progressively reopened from Realp, as a heritage railway operated by the Furka Steam Railway (DFB).  On , the DFB was extended from its then temporary terminus at Furka to Gletsch via the Furka Summit Tunnel, and the station at Gletsch was reopened.

At a ceremony held on 12 August 2010, the rest of the superseded ex-FO line was formally reopened, following the completion of another DFB extension, this time from Gletsch to Oberwald.  At an earlier ceremony on 18 June 2010, a gold spike had been driven to mark the physical reconnection.  Scheduled DFB services between Gletsch and Oberwald commenced on 13 August 2010.

See also

History of rail transport in Switzerland
Rail transport in Switzerland

References

Notes

Further reading

External links

 Furka Steam Railway 
 Matterhorn Gotthard Bahn
 Official timetable of Switzerland

Railway stations in the canton of Valais

Railway stations in Switzerland opened in 1914